The Play-offs of the 2006 Fed Cup Europe/Africa Zone Group II were the final stages of the Group II Zonal Competition involving teams from Europe and Africa. Using the positions determined in their pools, the seven teams faced off to determine their placing in the 2006 Fed Cup Europe/Africa Zone Group II. The top two teams advanced to Group I, and the bottom two teams were relegated down to the Group III for the next year.

Promotion play-offs
The top two teams of each pool were placed against each other in two head-to-head rounds. The winner of the rounds advanced to Group I for next year.

Lithuania vs. Portugal

Georgia vs. Poland

Relegation play-offs
Because there was one extra player in Pool B, the last-placed team of that pool was automatically relegated down to Group III. The third-placed teams of each pool were then placed against each other in a tie, where the losing team would join the Latvians in relegation.

Ireland vs. Greece

Final Placements

  and  advanced to the Europe/Africa Zone Group I for the next year. The Poles placed third overall, while the Lithuanians placed last in their pool of four and lost their play-offs, and thus faced relegation back to Group II for 2007.
The Irish and Latvians respectively placed first and second in the same pool of five, meaning that Latvia would remain in Group III for 2008, while Ireland would advance back to Group II.

See also
Fed Cup structure

References

External links
 Fed Cup website

2006 Fed Cup Europe/Africa Zone